Petal and Blosm are both Los Angeles based graffiti artists, muralists and environmental activists.

Petal or Peligro Abejas (Danger Beez) has been writing graffiti art since the early 1990s.  She is known for her iconic Bees symbols which brings awareness to her "Save the Beez" Foundation, which educates the public about the dangers of environmental pollution to bees. Petal's influence in the arts began at an early age as she was encouraged to develop various painting styles and methods. As she developed her writing skills in "Black Books" and was influenced by various calligraphy styles, she learned the ability to write on walls on a larger scale.

Blosm is a Los Angeles-based graffiti artist and muralist. She has been writing graffiti art since the late 1980s. She is one of the few Los Angeles-based graffiti artists to have made a strong impact as a woman in a male-dominated graffiti art movement.

Petal and Blosm were two of the women graffiti artists who took part in the LA Liber Aminicorum, which is also known as The Getty Graffiti Black Book.

Both Petal and Blosm have established their names and entered their work in art shows such as the ESMOA; Las Amazonas-LA Graffiti Women which was held on August 9, 2014 at the ESMoA museum, in conjunction with the previous Scratch Art Show which was held on June 8, a lecture discussing the women in the Getty Black Book, as well as discussing issues of art, culture and most importantly feminism.

More recently Petal and Blosm took part in the Los Angeles Art Show 2015 at the Los Angeles Convention Center, as part of the Mural Conservancy of Los Angeles exhibition. The Danger Beez, assisted by Los Angeles-based muralist Sonji, did live art painting for the public, taking the opportunity of raising awareness of police brutality, social injustice and what was called "an uprising of consciousness".

References

American graffiti artists
Artists from Los Angeles
Women graffiti artists
Women muralists